Rudy Rush, (born September 27, 1973), is an American comedian.

In 2000, he became the host of Showtime at the Apollo.

References

External links
 Rudy Rush on MySpace
 

Living people
1973 births
African-American male comedians
American male comedians
21st-century American comedians
American stand-up comedians
21st-century African-American people
20th-century African-American people